Nationality words link to articles with information on the nation's poetry or literature (for instance, Irish or France).

Events

Works published
 John Cotgrave, The English Treasury of Wit and Language: collected out of the most, and best of our English  poems; methodically digested into common places for generall use. By John Cotgrave, Gent (full title, but punctuation and spelling here may be different from the actual title page), contains verse drama, quotations, maxims, etc. London: Printed for Humphrey Moseley
 Sir John Denham, Coopers Hill, first authorized edition (see also Coopers Hill 1642)
 Sir Richard Fanshawe, translator, The Lusiad; or, Portugals Historicall Poem, translated from the Portuguese of Luis de Camoens
 Henry Lawes, The Second Book of Ayres, and Dialogues, for One, Two, and Three Voyces, verse and music (see also Ayres and Dialogues 1653, 1658)
 Andrew Marvell, The First Anniversary of the Government Under His Highness the Lord Protector, published anonymously, on Oliver Cromwell
 John Milton, On the Late Massacre in Piedmont
 John Phillips, A Saytr Against Hypocrites, published anonymously; an attack on Oliver Cromwell and Puritanism
 Henry Vaughan, Silex Scintillans: Sacred poems and private ejaculations, second edition (see also Silex Scintillans 1650)
 Edmund Waller, A Panegyrick to my Lord Protector, on Oliver Cromwell
 George Wither, The Protector, on Oliver Cromwell

Births
Death years link to the corresponding "[year] in poetry" article:
 Jean-François Regnard (died 1709), French poet
 Lin Yining (died c. 1730), Qing dynasty Chinese poet
 Nalan Xingde (died 1685), Qing dynasty Chinese poet most famous for his ci poetry

Deaths
Birth years link to the corresponding "[year] in poetry" article:
 Robert Aylett (born 1583), English lawyer and religious poet
 Cyrano de Bergerac (born 1619), French soldier and poet
 Daniel Heinsius (born 1580), scholar who wrote Latin and Dutch poetry
 Francesco Pona (born 1595), Italian doctor, philosopher, Marinist poet and writer

See also

 Poetry
 17th century in poetry
 17th century in literature

Notes

17th-century poetry
Poetry